Arturo Carbonaro (born 4 March 1986) is an Italian football defender who plays for Chiavari Caperana.

External links
Career statistics 

Living people
1986 births
Italian footballers
U.S. Salernitana 1919 players
Association football defenders